The following is a list of the larger Brachycera recorded in Britain, this includes the soldierflies and their allies.

Family Xylophagidae
 Xylophagus ater - common awl-fly
 Xylophagus cinctus - red-belted awl-fly
 Xylophagus junki - Glenmore awl-fly

Family Athericidae
 Atherix ibis - yellow-legged water-snipefly
 Atherix marginata - black-legged water-snipefly
 Atrichops crassipes - least water-snipefly

Family Rhagionidae
 Chrysopilus asiliformis - little snipefly
 Chrysopilus cristatus - black snipefly
 Chrysopilus erythrophthalmus - silver-banded snipefly
 Chrysopilus laetus - tree snipefly
 Ptiolina nigra - pale-fringed moss-snipefly
 Ptiolina obscura - black-fringe moss-snipefly
 Rhagio annulatus - wood snipefly
 Rhagio lineola - small fleck-winged snipefly
 Rhagio notatus - large fleck-winged snipefly
 Rhagio scolopaceus - downlooker snipefly
 Rhagio strigosus - yellow downlooker snipefly
 Rhagio tringarius - marsh snipefly
 Spania nigra - liverwort snipefly
 Symphoromyia crassicornis - moorland snipefly
 Symphoromyia immaculata - limestone snipefly

Family Tabanidae

Subfamily Chrysopsinae
 Chrysops caecutiens - splayed deerfly
 Chrysops relictus - twin-lobed deerfly
 Chrysops sepulcralis - black deerfly
 Chrysops viduatus - square-spot deerfly

Subfamily Tabaninae
 Haematopota bigoti - big-spotted cleg
 Haematopota crassicornis - black-horned cleg
 Haematopota grandis - long-horned cleg
 Haematopota pluvialis - horse fly, cleg fly or cleg, sometimes notch-horned cleg 
 Haematopota subcylindrica - Levels cleg
 Atylotus fulvus - golden horsefly
 Atylotus latistriatus - saltmarsh horsefly
 Atylotus plebeius - Cheshire horsefly
 Atylotus rusticus - four-lined horsefly
 Hybomitra bimaculata - hairy-legged horsefly
 Hybomitra ciureai - Levels yellow-horned horsefly
 Hybomitra distinguenda - bright horsefly
 Hybomitra expollicata - striped horsefly
 Hybomitra lurida - broad-headed horsefly
 Hybomitra micans - black-legged horsefly
 Hybomitra montana - slender-horned horsefly
 Hybomitra muehlfeldi - broadland horsefly
 Hybomitra solstitialis - scarce forest horsefly
 Tabanus autumnalis - large marsh horsefly
 Tabanus bovinus - pale giant horsefly
 Tabanus bromius - band-eyed brown horsefly
 Tabanus cordiger - plain-eyed grey horsefly
 Tabanus glaucopsis - downland horsefly
 Tabanus maculicornis - narrow-winged horsefly
 Tabanus miki - plain-eyed brown horsefly
 Tabanus sudeticus - dark giant horsefly

Family Xylomyidae
 Solva marginata - drab wood-soldierfly
 Solva varia (Meigen, 1820)
 Xylomya maculata - wasp wood-soldierfly

Family Stratiomyidae

Subfamily Beridinae
 Beris chalybata - murky-legged black legionnaire
 Beris clavipes - scarce orange legionnaire
 Beris fuscipes - short-horned black legionnaire
 Beris geniculata - long-horned black legionnaire
 Beris morrisii - yellow-legged black legionnaire
 Beris vallata - common orange legionnaire
 Chorisops nagatomii - bright four-spined legionnaire
 Chorisops tibialis - dull four-spined legionnaire

Subfamily Clitellariinae
 Clitellaria ephippium

Subfamily Nemotelinae
 Nemotelus nigrinus - all-black snout
 Nemotelus notatus - flecked snout
 Nemotelus pantherinus - fen snout
 Nemotelus uliginosus - barred snout

Subfamily Pachygastrinae
 Eupachygaster tarsalis - sarce black
 Neopachygaster meromelaena - silver-strips black
 Pachygaster atra - dark-winged black
 Pachygaster leachii - yellow-legged black
 Zabrachia tenella - pine black

Subfamily Sarginae
 Chloromyia formosa - broad centurion
 Microchrysa cyaneiventris - black gem
 Microchrysa flavicornis - green gem
 Microchrysa polita - black-horned gem
 Sargus bipunctatus - twin-spot centurion
 Sargus cuprarius - clouded centurion
 Sargus flavipes - yellow-legged centurion
 Sargus iridatus - iridescent centurion

Subfamily Stratiomyinae

Tribe Oxycerini
 Oxycera analis - dark-winged soldier
 Oxycera dives - round-spotted major
 Oxycera fallenii - Irish major
 Oxycera leonina - twin-spotted major
 Oxycera morrisii - white-barred soldier
 Oxycera nigricornis - delicate soldier
 Oxycera pardalina - hill soldier
 Oxycera pygmaea - pygmy soldier
 Oxycera rara - four-barred major
 Oxycera terminata - yellow-tipped soldier
 Oxycera trilineata - three-lined soldier
 Vanoyia tenuicornis - long-horned soldier

Tribe Stratiomyini

 Odontomyia angulata - orange-horned green colonel
 Odontomyia argentata - silver colonel
 Odontomyia hydroleon - barred green colonel
 Odontomyia ornata - ornate brigadier
 Odontomyia tigrina - black colonel
 Oplodontha viridula - common green colonel
 Stratiomys chamaeleon - clubbed general
 Stratiomys longicornis - long-horned general
 Stratiomys potamida - banded general
 Stratiomys singularior - flecked general

Family Acroceridae
 Ogcodes gibbosus - smart-banded hunchback
 Ogcodes pallipes - black-rimmed hunchback
 Paracrocera orbiculus - top-horned hunchback

Family Bombyliidae

Subfamily Bombyliinae
 Bombylius canescens - western bee-fly
 Bombylius discolor - dotted bee-fly
 Bombylius major - dark-edged bee-fly
 Bombylius minor - heath bee-fly

Subfamily Exoprosopinae
 Thyridanthrax fenestratus - mottled bee-fly
 Villa cingulata - downland villa
 Villa modesta - dune villa
 Villa venusta - heath villa

Subfamily Phthiriinae

 Phthiria pulicaria - flea bee-fly

Family Therevidae
 Acrosathe annulata - coastal silver-stiletto
 Cliorismia rustica - southern silver-stiletto
 Dialineura anilis - swollen silver-stiletto
 Pandivirilia melaleuca - forest silver-stiletto
 Spiriverpa lunulata - northern silver-stiletto
 Thereva cinifera - large plain stiletto
 Thereva fulva - small plain stiletto
 Thereva handlirschi - golden Scottish stiletto
 Thereva inornata - light Scottish stiletto
 Thereva nobilitata - common stiletto
 Thereva plebeja - crochet-hooked stiletto
 Thereva strigata - cliff stiletto
 Thereva unica - twin-spot stiletto synonym bipunctata
 Thereva valida - dark northern stiletto

Family Scenopinidae
 Scenopinus fenestralis - house windowfly
 Scenopinus niger - forest windowfly

Family Asilidae

Subfamily Asilinae
 Asilus crabroniformis - hornet robberfly
 Dysmachus trigonus - fan-bristled robberfly
 Eutolmus rufibarbis - golden-tabbed robberfly
 Machimus arthriticus - breck robberfly
 Machimus atricapillus - kite-tailed robberfly
 Machimus cingulatus - brown heath robberfly
 Machimus cowini - Manx robber fly
 Machimus rusticus - downland robberfly
 Neoitamus cothurnatus - scarce awl robberfly
 Neoitamus cyanurus - common awl robberfly
 Neomochtherus pallipes - Devon red-legged robberfly
 Pamponerus germanicus - pied-winged robberfly
 Philonicus albiceps - dune robberfly
 Rhadiurgus variabilis - northern robberfly

Subfamily Dasypogoninae
 Leptarthrus brevirostris - slender-footed robberfly
 Leptarthrus vitripennis - false slender-footed robberfly

Subfamily Laphriinae
 Choerades gilvus - ginger robberfly
 Choerades marginata - golden-haired robberfly
 Laphria flava - bumblebee robberfly

Subfamily Leptogastrinae
 Leptogaster cylindrica - striped slender robberfly
 Leptogaster guttiventris - dashed slender robberfly

Subfamily Stenopogoninae
 Dioctria atricapilla - violet black-legged robberfly
 Dioctria baumhaueri - stripe-legged robberfly
 Dioctria cothurnata - scarce red-legged robberfly
 Dioctria linearis - small yellow-legged robberfly
 Dioctria oelandica - orange-legged robberfly
 Dioctria rufipes - common red-legged robberfly
 Lasiopogon cinctus - spring heath robberfly

References

Soldierflies and allies, Britain
Soldierflies
Soldierflies and allies, Britain